The Human Tissue Act 2004 is an Act of the Parliament of the United Kingdom, that applied to England, Northern Ireland and Wales, which consolidated previous legislation and created the Human Tissue Authority to "regulate the removal, storage, use and disposal of human bodies, organs and tissue." The Act does not extend to Scotland; its counterpart there is the Human Tissue (Scotland) Act 2006.

Background 
The Act was brought about as a consequence of, among things, the Alder Hey organs scandal, in which organs of children had been retained by the Alder Hey Children's Hospital without consent, and the Kennedy inquiry into heart surgery on children at the Bristol Royal Infirmary. A consultative exercise followed the Government's Green Paper, Human Bodies, Human Choices (2002), and earlier recommendations by the Chief Medical Officer, Sir Liam Donaldson.

The Act 
The Act allows for anonymous organ donation (previously, living people could only donate organs to those to whom they had a genetic or emotional connection), and requires licences for those intending to publicly display human remains, such as BODIES... The Exhibition. The Act also specifies that in cases of organ donation after death the wishes of the deceased takes precedence over the wishes of relatives, but a parliamentary report concluded in 2006 that the Act likely would fail in this regard since most surgeons would be unwilling to confront families in such situations.

The Act prohibits selling organs. In 2007 a man became the first person convicted under the Act for trying to sell his kidney online for £24,000 in order to pay off his gambling debts.

Regulations
The following orders have been made under this section:
The Human Tissue Act 2004 (Commencement No. 1) Order 2005 (S.I. 2005/919)
The Human Tissue Act 2004 (Commencement No. 2) Order 2005 (S.I. 2005/2632 (C. 108))
The Human Tissue Act 2004 (Commencement No. 3 and Transitional Provisions) Order 2005 (S.I. 2005/2792 (C. 115))
The Human Tissue Act 2004 (Commencement No. 4 and Transitional Provisions) Order 2006
The Human Tissue Act 2004 (Commencement No. 5 and Transitional Provisions) Order 2006 (S.I. 2006/1997 (C. 68))
The Human Tissue Act 2004 (Commencement No.5 and Transitional Provisions) (Amendment) Order 2006 (S.I. 2006/2169)

Application 
There is no official report on the number of restitutions that have been permitted under the Human Tissue Act 2004. In the United Kingdom, museums are not required to disclose such information. The table below therefore establishes a non-exhaustive list of human remains that have been restituted following the implementation of the Human Tissue Act.

See also
Human Transplantation (Wales) Act 2013

References

Citations

Notes

Further reading

United Kingdom Acts of Parliament 2004
Acts of the Parliament of the United Kingdom concerning healthcare
Organ transplantation in the United Kingdom
Acts of the Parliament of the United Kingdom concerning England
Tissues (biology)
Acts of the Parliament of the United Kingdom concerning Northern Ireland
Acts of the Parliament of the United Kingdom concerning Wales